Ashwini Kapoor (born 30 June 1965) is an Indian former cricketer. He played first-class cricket for Delhi and Punjab between 1984 and 1991.

See also
 List of Delhi cricketers

References

External links
 

1965 births
Living people
Indian cricketers
Delhi cricketers
Punjab, India cricketers
Cricketers from Delhi